Lauri Merten (born July 6, 1960) is an American professional golfer. She also competed under the names Lauri Peterson (1983–87) and Lauri Merten-Peterson (1988).

Merten was born in Waukesha, Wisconsin. She attended Arizona State University and joined the LPGA Tour in 1983.

Merten's three wins on the LPGA Tour came at the 1983 Rail Charity Golf Classic, the 1984 Jamie Farr Toledo Classic and the 1993 U.S. Women's Open, which is one of the LPGA's major championships.

When she retired, Merten claimed burnout was the cause. Another factor was undoubtedly the unwanted attention surrounding the murder conviction of her brother-in-law Thomas Capano in 1996.

Professional wins

LPGA Tour wins (3)

LPGA Tour playoff record (1–0)

Major championships

Wins (1)

References

External links

American female golfers
LPGA Tour golfers
Winners of LPGA major golf championships
Golfers from Wisconsin
Sportspeople from Waukesha, Wisconsin
1960 births
Living people
21st-century American women